Ekaterina Rumyantseva (born 28 January 1991) is a Russian biathlete and cross-country skier. She represented the Neutral Paralympic Athletes at the 2018 Winter Paralympics, which is also her first Paralympic competition.

Ekaterina clinched a gold medal in the women's 6km standing event at the 2018 Winter Paralympics, while the silver medal was claimed by her fellow Russian compatriot Anna Milenina in the relevant event, who also competed under the Neutral Paralympic flag.

She was named "Disabled Female Athlete of the Year" in the nomination "Overcoming" by the Ministry of Sport of Russia.

References

External links 
 

1991 births
Living people
Russian female biathletes
Russian female cross-country skiers
Biathletes at the 2018 Winter Paralympics
Paralympic biathletes of Russia
Medalists at the 2018 Winter Paralympics
Cross-country skiers at the 2018 Winter Paralympics
Paralympic cross-country skiers of Russia
Paralympic medalists in biathlon
Paralympic medalists in cross-country skiing